WTGV-FM (97.7 FM) is a radio station broadcasting a classic hits/oldies format, serving Sandusky and the Thumb and Blue Water area of Michigan. WTGV is owned and operated by Sanilac Broadcasting.

History

The station began broadcasting in 1971 under the WMIC-FM call sign, simulcasting WMIC-AM 1560 (now 660).  WMIC-FM separated programming in 1977, switching to a beautiful music format, and adopted the WTGV ("Thumb's Great Voice") call sign two years later. The beautiful music format was updated to a MOR music mix over the years, and then to mainstream adult contemporary by 2000.

WTGV-FM was almost fully automated and voicetracked, except for simulcasts of news and information programming from its sister station WMIC (which are carried solely on WTGV after AM sign-off). The station also features a large amount of sports play-by-play, including the Detroit Tigers and Detroit Lions, and local high-school sports such as basketball and football.

On June 20, 2017 97.7 switched from automated AC to a satellite-fed Classic Hits format branded as "97-7 WTGV." The format, sourced from Local Radio Networks, targets Hits of the 1970s, 80s, and 90s, with a few late '60s hits included. News, sports, and weather remains unchanged.

Previous Logo

Sources
Sanilac Broadcasting - WMIC-AM/WTGV-FM/WBGV-FM 
Michiguide.com - WTGV-FM History

External links

TGV-FM
Classic hits radio stations in the United States
Radio stations established in 1971